"I Will Wait" is a song by American singer and songwriter Nick Carter. The song was released in U.S and Canada as a digital download on September 12, 2015. It was the first single from his third solo album All American.

Background
"When I wrote the song, I think we wrote it with the intention going back to what the Backstreet Boys and what we were known for, which is love songs. As a writer and an artist, sometimes as your career goes on, you try to make points, and you try to be overly creative." Nick Carter said, "I just wanted to go back to the basics, and tap into what our fans knew us for." He also claimed this song was inspired by Ed Sheeran's songwriting.

Music video
The music video for "I Will Wait" was filmed and released on YouTube and Vevo on September 22, 2015. Carter stated that the inspiration of the video was based on The Notebook.

Live performance
On November 24, Carter first performed the song on the finale of Dancing with the Stars, where he was one of the four finalists. After the promotion, the song climbed to Top 100 on iTunes but dropped out of the chart sooner.

Track listing

Charts

Release history

References

External links

 
 

2015 singles
2015 songs
Songs written by Nick Carter (musician)
Songs written by Dan Muckala